Marjorie Barrows (1892 - 1983) was an American magazine editor, book compiler, and author.

Career
Barrows was an editor of Child Life Magazine and Family Weekly, as well as a book reviewer for The Continent. A 1932 article from Spring Lake Gazette stated that Barrows was "a famous editor of Child Life Magazine and that she was an "internationally recognized editor" of the same magazine. An article from School Life reported in 1933 that she "has the endorsement of leading children's librarians".

A 1932 review in the Standard-Examiner reported that The Picture Book of Poetry, which was compiled by Barrows, has "gems of verses by writers who understand boys and girls". The Denton Record-Chronicle reviewed The Family Reader in 1961, stating, The Family Reader is a book for your lighter moments, for the times you want to relax and lose yourself in a good story".

Bibliography
The Children's Hour
One Thousand Beautiful Things
Muggins Mouse
Muggins Takes Off
Muggins' Big Balloon
Muggins Becomes A Hero
The Quintessence Of Beauty And Romance
The Family Reader
Treasures Of Love Inspiration
1000 Beautiful Things
One Hundred Best Poems For Boys And Girls
Jojo
A Treasury Of Humor And Toastmaster's Handbook
The Peoples Reader
Timothy Tiger
The American Experience
The Children's Treasury
Look! A Parade
Fraidy Cat
Pet Show
A Book Of Famous Poems For Older Boys And Girls
A Book Of Famous Poems
Pet Show
Ezra the Elephant
Currents In Drama
Scamper
Science Fiction & Readers Guide
Hoppity
Lancelot
Pudgy the Little Bear
Pulitzer Prize Poems
The Frances Tipton Hunter Picture Book
Sukey, You Shall Be My Wife And Other Stories
Snuggles
Whiskers

References

1892 births
1993 deaths
Women magazine editors
American magazine editors
20th-century American women writers